Walter Henry Overs (March 26, 1870 – June 17, 1934) was the fifth bishop of the Episcopal Diocese of Liberia.

References 

1870 births
1934 deaths
Bishops of the Episcopal Church (United States)
Anglican bishops of Liberia